Victor, West Virginia may refer to:
Victor, Fayette County, West Virginia, an unincorporated community in Fayette County
Victor, Kanawha County, West Virginia, an unincorporated community in Kanawha County